Modern Meadow is an American biotechnology company that uses biofabrication to create sustainable materials. The company was co-founded by Andras Forgacs, Gabor Forgacs, Karoly Jakab and Francoise Marga in 2011, and is based in Nutley, New Jersey.

History 
In 2011, Andras Forgacs and his father Gabor Forgacs, Jakab and Marga co-founded Modern Meadow. The company’s initial goal was to create leather and meat in tissue cultures, without the use of live animals.

In 2018, Modern Meadow partnered with Evonik to commercially produce biofabricated materials.

Modern Meadow entered into a joint venture in 2021 with Limonta, an Italian textiles and materials company, to create BioFabricca. The new company creates sustainable materials through a process called biofabrication.

In 2017, it was announced that Modern Meadow had plans to develop the “world’s first biofabricated leather”. The company displayed a prototype T-shirt made from the material at the Museum of Modern Art in an exhibit, “Items: Is Fashion Modern,” until 2018.

Technology 
The company makes plant-based protein biopolymers to create a variety of textiles. It combines plant-based proteins with  bio-based polyurethane. The resulting polymer blend is called Bio-Alloy.

References 

Cellular agriculture
Companies established in 2011
Manufacturing companies of the United States